Maksymilian Stryjek (born 18 July 1996) is a Polish professional footballer who plays as a goalkeeper for EFL League One side Wycombe Wanderers. He was a Poland youth international.

Club career
Born in Warsaw, Stryjek began playing football for his school at the age of 6. He signed for Polonia Warsaw at the age of 11. He moved to English club Sunderland in 2013, following a trial with the club.

He spent a loan spell with Boston United in 2015, making 10 league and 2 cup appearances for them. In February 2016 he signed a new contract with Sunderland, lasting until 2019, and in July 2017 he made his senior debut for the club, in a friendly game. He moved on loan to Accrington Stanley on transfer deadline day, 31 August 2017. He was injured 9 minutes into his professional debut, on 2 September 2017.

On 21 September, Stryjek joined National League side Eastleigh on a one-month loan to replace the recently-retired Graham Stack. On 11 June 2019, Sunderland announced that Stryjek was to leave the club when his contract expired at the end of that month.

On 1 July 2019, Stryjek returned to Eastleigh, this time on a one-year deal. He returned home to Poland as the season was terminated and he was released due to the COVID-19 outbreak. After a successful trial he signed for Scottish club Livingston in 20 July 2020 on a three-year deal.

On 18 August 2022, he signed for EFL League One side Wycombe Wanderers.

International career
Stryjek has represented Poland at under-17, under-18, and under-19 youth international levels. In March 2017 he was called up by the under-21 team for the first time, and went to the U21 Euro's in June.

Career statistics

References

External links
 

1996 births
Living people
Footballers from Warsaw
Association football goalkeepers
Polish footballers
Poland youth international footballers
Polonia Warsaw players
Sunderland A.F.C. players
Boston United F.C. players
Accrington Stanley F.C. players
Eastleigh F.C. players
Livingston F.C. players
Wycombe Wanderers F.C. players
English Football League players
Scottish Professional Football League players
Polish expatriate footballers
Polish expatriate sportspeople in England
Expatriate footballers in England
Polish expatriates in Scotland
Expatriate footballers in Scotland